Venus Envy is a webcomic written and designed by a trans woman, and artist, named Crystal Frasier. It was first released in 2001. In addition to dealing with the themes of transgender people and gender transition, the strip also deals with other themes such as adolescence in general, William Shakespeare and women's soccer.

Plot
Zoë Carter has severe depression and is sent to therapy after telling her parents about transitioning to a teenage girl, leading to problems in Punxsutawney, Pennsylvania, with the family relocating to the fictional town of Salem, to begin anew.

Characters

Main characters
 Zoë Alexis Carter - The 16-year-old teenage protagonist of the webcomic who transitions to a trans woman at age 15, beginning her hormone replacement therapy, even practicing to make her voice sound more feminine. She is often anxious and irritable but makes friends with those at Salem High School, even though her little brother is resentful of this change. She also has red, not blonde, hair, and is bisexual, like Nina.

 Larson Delgado - A trans Latino boy who is, like Lisa, friends with Zoë, going to the same high school. His transition was similar to that of Zoë, taking HRT, but his parents didn't pay much attention to it, and he often wears chest binders.

 Lisa van Gogh - A lesbian teen who is friends with Zoë, goes to high school with her and is comfortable with her sexual identity. She is on the soccer team, which is filled with other lesbians.

 Nina dell' Abade  - A friend of Zoë who is bisexual and a theatre kid.

 Eric Smith - Runs a secret social club, is groomed by a girl named Grace, and was in a romantic relationship with Zoë.

 Brianna Michaels - A woman who goes to the same high school as Lisa, Larson, and Zoë, who says she is psychic. She is also skilled at dancing, including ballet.

 Grace Allen - A psychopath who does not care about lives of other people, an actress, and manipulator of people, heading the Casanova Society at the local high school.

Supporting characters

 Robert Carter - A Jewish professor of English literature and father of Zoë, who is overprotective.

 Helen Carter - An anesthesiologist and overbearing mother of Zoë, who refuses to see her as a girl.

 Chris/tine - He crosses and blurs the line between sexes, often crossdressing.

Release
Frasier said the title of the comic is not original but came from a talk with her roommate and noted the similar title of a book by Rita Mae Brown, and added that the name itself is a comical take on the word "penis envy". She also wrote that the first weeks of the comic were not meant to have any character development or part of a storyline, and noted that the shirt worn by Zoë was a "simplified symbol" for trans woman designed by Matt Nishii. Frasier said she was inspired to begin the comic, after reading Garfield, Sluggy Freelance, and being encouraged by her roommate to put it online. She also said that the comic came out "by accident", developed in a newspaper style with three to four panels in a single row, with each strip made on sheets of sketch paper, and said that the stories of the comic interconnect. The first panels of the comic were posted on November 6, 2001, but the comic did not begin until December 1, 2001. Frasier also said that she was inspired by the webcomic Real Life and that the webcomic would not have existed without Jennifer Lynn's Antijen Pages, a resource for trans people.

By 2003, the independent comic had at least 150,000 visitors visiting the comic's website every day. In September 2004, Frasier, in an interview said she had the whole plot of the entire series "plotted out" with occasional storylines which differed from the normal, like "Unholy Alliance", where a lesbian separatist asks a cross dresser out on a date. In the same interview said that she was receiving occasional fan mail, despite the comic being one of the most popular on Keenspace. In November 2004, Frasier ran a comic expressing her dissatisfaction with the results of the United States elections that year, leading some readers to say she should "shut the fuck up and draw the comic." In 2006, it was said that the webcomic had grown into "a vocation that includes public speaking and organizing about transgender and queer issues" for Frasier. The last issue of the webcomic posted on January 30, 2014. In May 2019, Frasier floated the idea of rebooting the comic as a graphic novel. In April 2020, her Twitter followers expressed interest in her picking up the comic's story ten years after the end of the comic in 2014 and expressed interest in January 2021 of writing a comic where "Zoe's a mom creeping up on middle age with a quirky family."

Spin-off and crossovers
In 2004, Fraiser convinced Sherri Belmar write a spinoff science fiction webcomic titled Venus Ascending, with some of the same characters, like Zoë, Lisa, Larson, Chris/tine, and a new character (Kim Tim). Some reviews called it a "trans gag strip" which has a "loose storyline". 

In 2011, Frasier did a crossover with Evelyn Poor's webcomic, Trans Girl Diaries. 

In December 2015, Frasier contributed to a holiday illustration featuring Zoë alongside trans protagonists of Jessica Durling's 2punk4you (Jess & Seb), Jenn Dolari's Closetspace (Carrie & Allison), Jessica Udischas's Manic Pixie Nightmare Girls (Jesska), Sophie Labelle's Assigned Male (Stephie), and Jocelyn Samara DiDomenick's Rain (Rain).

Reception
Yes Homo said that in 2015, the webcomic made them "pretty dang excited", although saying that the webcomic is "pretty bad" but made them feel better about themselves, and rated the webcomic higher than Rain which the same reviewer gave an F, arguing that the comic is "capable of making a joke that isn’t based in transphobia" even as it "ran out of steam" toward the end of its run. The review said that the name of the webcomic is problematic, that it is aged, has "digs at" non-binary people, and mostly has White characters, but that it is better than "most mainstream portrayals of trans people in TV and film to this day." Their final verdict on the comic was not recommending the webcomic, calling the gender politics a "bit too antiquated" but said that you can read it if you are interested in knowing how far trans comics have come since 2005. In contrast, Laura Seabrook, in a review for Polare, called the comic "really important", praising Zoe as a well-rounded, believable character, accompanied by a consistent and well-done supporting cast. Seabrook differentiates Venus Envy it from Chris Hazleton's Misfile about a character who has to accept their gender transition.

The comic was later cited as an inspiration by a trans woman, Alexandra Pitchford, who created a webcomic named Bitz, and by Evelyn Poor, who created Trans Girl Diaries.

Notes

References

External links
Character profiles on official site of Venus Envy

2001 webcomic debuts
LGBT-related webcomics
Transgender-related comics